Peloridium hammoniorum is a species of moss bug from southern South America, and is the only known species in the genus Peloridium.

It was first described in 1897 by Gustav Breddin from a specimen found at Puerto Toro on Navarin Island in Tierra del Fuego. A Swedish expedition collected a second specimen in a forest on the Brunswick Peninsula near Punta Arenas, Chile, and Haglund unknowingly described it as a new genus and species (Nordenskjoldiella insignis), but it later proved to be a sub-brachypterous female corresponding with the macropterous male described by Breddin.

Peloridium hammoniorum is the only Peloridiidae that has both a flying and a flightless form, all others have only flightless forms.

Notes

References
 
 ; reprinted by De Gruyter, Walter, Inc., 
 
 
 
 
 
 

Peloridiidae